The Central District of Khanmirza County is in Chaharmahal and Bakhtiari province, Iran. At the 2006 census, the region's population (as the former Khanmirza District of Lordegan County) was 31,320 in 6,391 households. The following census in 2011 counted 33,000 people in 7,915 households. At the latest census in 2016, there were 36,360 inhabitants living in 9,872 households. After the census, Khanmirza District became the Central District, and Armand Rural District of Lordegan's Central District became Armand District in the new county.

References 

Khanmirza County

Districts of Chaharmahal and Bakhtiari Province

Populated places in Chaharmahal and Bakhtiari Province

Populated places in Khanmirza County

fa:بخش مرکزی شهرستان خانمیرزا